Jung Seung-hwan is a Korean name consisting of the family name Jung and the given name Seung-hwan, and may also refer to:

 Jung Seung-hwan (singer) (born 1996), South Korean singer
 Jung Seung-hwan (sledge hockey) (born 1988), South Korean sledge hockey player